Cachoeira de Goiás is a municipality in eastern Goiás state, Brazil.

Location
Distance to the state capital:  172 km.
Distance to regional center (Iporá):  77 km.
Highway connections:  state highway GO-060 west from Goiânia, through Trindade, São Luís de Montes Belos, and then GO-417 for 44 kilometers southwest to Cachoeira de Goiás. For all highway connections see Seplan.  Neighboring municipalities are Ivolândia, Moiporá, Aurilândia,  and  Paraúna.

Demographics
The population growth rate from 1996 to 2007 was  0.25%.  Out of the total population of 1,410, 1,106 were considered urban while 304 were considered rural.  The population has increased by about 200 persons since the census of 1980 with the urban population doubling and the rural population decreasing by half.

The economy
The economy is based on cattle raising (24,000 head in 2006), agriculture, retail establishments, and several modest transformation industries.

Agricultural data 2006
Farms:  109
Total area:  28,823 ha.
Area of permanent crops: not available
Area of perennial crops: not available
Area of natural pasture:  22,025 ha.
Area of woodland and forests:  5,812 ha.
Persons dependent on farming:  300
Farms with tractors: 13
Number of tractors:  20
Cattle herd:  24,000 head

Health and education
Infant mortality in 2000: 35.47
Literacy rate in 2000: 82.4
Schools: 02
Total number of students: 425
Municipal Human Development Index:  0.704

History
The settlement of Cachoeira de Goiás began in 1892 when Manoel Fernandes Pereira and other families built a chapel honoring the Divine Spirit.  The  growth was slow until Coronel Francisco Seabra de Guimarães worked to make it a district of the capital Goiás with the name of Cachoeira da Fumaça.  In 1938 it became a district of the municipality of Paraúna with the name Moitu, of unknown origin.  In 1948 it became a district in the municipality of Aurilândia, finally becoming independent in 1953.

See also
List of municipalities in Goiás
Microregions of Goiás

References

Frigoletto

Municipalities in Goiás